The Davščica, also the Davča, is a stream in Slovenia. It is a right tributary of the Selca Sora River. It has a torrential character and often floods.

References

External links
 Davča. Geopedia.si. Accessed 1 February 2012.

Rivers of Upper Carniola